The fifth season of Family Guy first aired on the Fox network in eighteen episodes from September 10, 2006 to May 20, 2007 before being released as two DVD box sets and in syndication. It premiered with the episode "Stewie Loves Lois" and finished with "Meet the Quagmires". The series follows the dysfunctional Griffin family—father Peter, mother Lois, daughter Meg, son Chris, baby Stewie and Brian, the family pet, who reside in their hometown of Quahog. The executive producers for the fifth season were David Goodman, Chris Sheridan, Danny Smith and series creator Seth MacFarlane. Sheridan and Goodman served as showrunners for the fifth season.

The season received positive reviews from critics, who praised that the series saw "no sign of tiring", and had "as many funny moments as ever." Some criticism went to the cite of a lack of original writing.

Season five contains some of the series' most acclaimed episodes, including "Barely Legal", "Airport '07" and "No Chris Left Behind". The fifth season won an Annie Award at the 35th Annie Awards for storyboarding and was nominated for three more, including writing and voice acting. It also won a Primetime Emmy Award for Outstanding Individual Achievement in Animation.

The Volume Five DVD box set was released in Region 1 on September 18, 2007, Region 2 on October 15, 2007 and Region 4 on November 25, 2009. Thirteen of the eighteen episodes are included in the volume. The remaining five episodes of the season were released on the Volume Six DVD box set, released in Region 1 on October 21, 2008, Region 2 on November 10, 2008 and Region 4 on November 25, 2009.

Production

Production for the fifth season began in 2005, during the airing of the fourth season. The season was executive produced by series regulars David A. Goodman, Seth MacFarlane, Chris Sheridan, and Danny Smith. In addition, Goodman served as showrunner throughout the season.

As production began, Tom Devanney, Kirker Butler, Cherry Chevapravatdumrong, Alec Sulkin, Wellesley Wild,
Patrick Meighan, Danny Smith, and future showrunners Mark Hentemann and Steve Callaghan all stayed on from the previous season. No new writers were hired after the conclusion of the fourth season. Alex Borstein, who serves as the voice of Lois, wrote her last episode, "It Takes a Village Idiot, and I Married One", and regular writers Ken Goin and Gary Janetti, who returned during season eight, left the series before the beginning of the fifth season.

Julius Wu and Brian Iles received their first directing credits this season. Mike Kim, James Purdum, Cyndi Tang, Greg Colton, Pete Michels, Zac Moncrief, John Holmquist and future Blue Harvest director Dominic Polcino all also stayed with the show from the previous season. This season, however, was director Dan Povenmire's last season before leaving the show to create his own series, entitled Phineas and Ferb, which would be nominated for three Emmy Awards.

The main cast consisted of Seth MacFarlane (Peter Griffin, Stewie Griffin, Brian Griffin, Quagmire, Tom Tucker), Alex Borstein (Lois Griffin, Loretta Brown, Tricia Takanawa, Barbara Pewterschmidt), Mila Kunis (Meg Griffin), Seth Green (Chris Griffin, Neil Goldman) and Mike Henry (Cleveland Brown, Herbert).

New recurring characters were also introduced in season five. The character of Jillian Fisher, Brian's new dimwitted girlfriend, was introduced in the episode "Whistle While Your Wife Works". She provided an ironic counterpoint to Brian's intellectualism. Her final character personality was designed to be a stereotypical blonde, "a bulimic cheerleader," and "not the brightest bauble on the tree." Her voice would later play upon the bulimic cheerleader element, with actress Drew Barrymore providing the voice of Jillian in eight episodes, five of which would be in season five. Other guest stars who made multiple appearances as recurring characters from previous seasons were Carrie Fisher as Peter's boss, Angela, and Phyllis Diller as Peter's mother. Seth MacFarlane's sister, Rachael MacFarlane, also made an appearance as Olivia, the child actress, when her character was apparently killed by Stewie in the episode "Chick Cancer".

The season ends just short of the series' 100th episode, which presents the funniest clips of the previous 99 episodes. The decision to end the fifth season before the 100th episode was made due to Fox executives' desire to show the Family Guy special "Blue Harvest" as the sixth-season premiere, which was still unfinished, at the end of the fifth season in May 2007.

Episodes

Reception
The fifth-season premiere "Stewie Loves Lois" received a 3.5 rating share in the Nielsen ratings among viewers age 18 to 49, attracting 9.93 million viewers overall, the highest rated episode of the entire season. Both of these figures significantly built upon numbers set by the fourth season finale. In the weeks following "Stewie Loves Lois", viewership ratings hovered just over 8 million. Aside from the premiere, "Hell Comes to Quahog", the third episode for the season, garnered the most viewers thereafter with 9.66 million, a high for the fifth season. While the episode "It Takes a Village Idiot, and I Married One" received the lowest number of viewers for the season with 7.22 million.

Episodes of the fifth season won several awards, including a Primetime Emmy Award. "No Chris Left Behind", which won for Outstanding Individual Achievement in Animation, became the third episode of the series to win an Emmy Award, and was awarded to Steven Fonti for his storyboard work in the episode. In addition, that same episode won an Annie Award for Storyboarding in an Animated Television Production. The season was nominated for three other Annie Awards—Character Animation in a Television Production (Eileen Kohlhepp for the series itself), Voice Acting in an Animated Television Production (Mila Kunis for "Barely Legal"), and Writing in an Animated Television Production (Kirker Butler for "Barely Legal").

The Parents Television Council, a frequent critic of Family Guy, branded "Stewie Loves Lois", "Barely Legal", "No Meals on Wheels", and "Bill and Peter's Bogus Journey" as the "worst show of the week." In response to this criticism, executive producer David Goodman claimed that Family Guy is "absolutely for teenagers and adults", and that he does not allow his own children to watch the show.

The season received positive reviews from critics. Ahsan Haque of IGN wrote mixed comments about the season, saying, "The ratio of bad to good episodes was not too favorable in this season of Family Guy. Far too many episodes were either seriously lacking in humor or were just plain poorly written", but added, "While much of the original appeal seems to have washed-off, there are still a few moments from this season that really stand out", listing "Chick Cancer", "Road to Rupert", "Saving Private Brian", and "No Meals on Wheels" as the best episodes of the season. Haque also gave praise to "Blind Ambition", "No Chris Left Behind", "Bill and Peter's Bogus Journey", and "Meet the Quagmires". Manisha Kanetkar of Smart House, however, felt that the series saw "no sign of tiring" and had "as many funny moments as ever." Nancy Basile of About.com regarded "Airport '07", "Prick Up Your Ears", and "Barely Legal" as "gem episodes." In his review for the Family Guy volume five DVD, Francis Rizzo III of DVD Talk said "There are several points to criticize when it comes to this set, including a series that's losing some of its steam and relying on comedic crutches and an oddly constructed episode structure, but in the end, the series is fun to watch, which is all you really ask for from a cartoon sitcom." In a later review, Rizzo added "Is Family Guy coasting on  past successes? It could be argued, as the series doesn't surprise or shock the way it once did, instead doing the things that have worked before and doing them more and larger. The DVD releases are predictable and consistent, with high quality and impressive rafts of bonus material, but if the show doesn't do it for you, that doesn't make much of a difference."

Home media release
The first thirteen episodes of the fifth season were released on DVD by 20th Century Fox in the United States and Canada on September 18, 2007, four months after they had completed broadcast on television. The "Volume Five" DVD release features bonus material including deleted scenes, animatics, and commentaries for every episode.

The remaining five episodes of the fifth season, along with the first seven of the sixth season, were also released under the title "Volume 6" by 20th Century Fox in the United States and Canada on October 21, 2008, five months after they had completed broadcast on television. The DVD release also features bonus material including deleted scenes, commentaries, and a 'making of' featurette.

Notes

References

General references
Family Guy season five episode guide. IGN Retrieved 2009-10-14.

External links

 Season 5 at IMDb

Family Guy (season 5) episodes
Family Guy seasons
2006 American television seasons
2007 American television seasons